The Bait may refer to:

 The Bait (1921 film), a silent film
 The Bait (1973 film), a crime film
 The Bait (1995 film), a French film
 Balladyna (film), a 2000 Polish film also known as The Bait
 The Bait, a song by the band Electric Guest